Ruskin Spear, CBE, RA (30 June 1911 – 16 January 1990) was an English painter and teacher of art, regarded as one of the foremost British portrait painters of his day.
Born in Hammersmith, Spear attended the local art school before going on to the Royal College of Art in 1930. He began his teaching career at Croydon School of Art, later teaching at the Royal College of Art from 1948 to 1975, where his students included Sandra Blow. Initially influenced by Walter Sickert, the Camden Town Group, and the portraiture of the Euston Road School, his work often has a narrative quality, with elements of humour and satire. As one of the thirty eight
Official War Artists in Britain in the Second World War, between 1942–44, Spear was commissioned  by the War Artists' Advisory Committee, under the chairmanship of Kenneth Clark, given a short-term contract, producing several works for the scheme.

Because he used a wheelchair due to childhood polio, much of his work concerned his immediate surroundings. He rendered the citizens of Hammersmith relaxing in and around the local pubs, theatres and shops.  In 1980, a retrospective of Spear's work was held at the Royal Academy in London.

Spear's paintings are held in important public collections in the United Kingdom, including the Tate Gallery Collection, Arts Council England, National Portrait Gallery, the Imperial War Museum, Government Art Collection and the Royal Academy of Arts, and worldwide. He was appointed a Commander of the Order of the British Empire (CBE) in 1979. Spear was the father of musician Roger Ruskin Spear.

Biography

Early life
Born in the London Borough of Hammersmith to a working-class family, Spear was the youngest of five children. Spear contracted polio at the age of two, and later attended the local Brook Green (PD) School, a London County Council school for the "Physically Defective". Awarded an LCC scholarship to the Hammersmith School of Art, Spear followed on with studies at the Royal College of Art, where he later was made a Royal Academician and tutor.

References

Further reading
 Harrod, Tanya (2022). Harrison, Martin (ed.). Humankind: Ruskin Spear – class, culture and art in 20th century Britain. London: EFB Publishing/Thames & Hudson.
 Levy, Mervyn (1985). Ruskin Spear. London : Weidenfeld and Nicolson.

External links 
 Official site: Ruskin Spear CBE RA - British Artist 1911-1990
 Ruskin Spear's Cats
 Ruskin Spear's work at ArtUK 

1911 births
1990 deaths
Alumni of the Royal College of Art
Academics of the Royal College of Art
20th-century English painters
English male painters
Commanders of the Order of the British Empire
People from Hammersmith
People with polio
Royal Academicians
20th-century English male artists